Volodymyr Andriyovych Zastavnyi (born 2 September 1990) is a Ukrainian professional footballer who plays as defender for Polish club Cosmos Nowotaniec.

Career
Zastavnyi is a product of two Lviv Oblast youth sportive schools. In February 2014 he signed contract with Moldavian Dacia Chișinău.

References

External links
 
 

1990 births
Sportspeople from Lviv
Ukrainian footballers
Living people
FC Hoverla Uzhhorod players
FC Lviv players
FC Zimbru Chișinău players
FC Dacia Chișinău players
FC Rukh Lviv players
FC Karpaty Lviv players
Ukrainian expatriate footballers
Expatriate footballers in Moldova
Ukrainian expatriate sportspeople in Moldova
Expatriate footballers in the Czech Republic
Ukrainian expatriate sportspeople in the Czech Republic
Expatriate footballers in Poland
Ukrainian expatriate sportspeople in Poland
Association football defenders
Ukrainian Premier League players
Ukrainian First League players
Ukrainian Second League players
IV liga players